"Avec toi" is a song by French singer Axel Tony and his first charting success in the SNEP French Singles Chart. The single was released on Universal Music France reaching #07 in the French charts.

Alternative version featuring Tunisiano

An alternative version featuring Tunisiano became popular after releasing the music video for the single. The video in a dominant white setting tells the story of a love affair gone sour and the singer Axel Tony reminiscing his love while Tunisiano is raps some consoling remarks.

Charts

References

2012 singles
French-language songs
2012 songs
Universal Music Group singles